The 1873 Kingston upon Hull by-election was held on 22 October 1873.  The byelection was fought due to the death of the incumbent Liberal MP, James Clay.  It was won by the Conservative candidate Joseph Walker Pease.

References

1873 in England
Elections in Kingston upon Hull
1873 elections in the United Kingdom
By-elections to the Parliament of the United Kingdom in Yorkshire and the Humber constituencies
19th century in Yorkshire